The 1906–07 season was the 12th competitive season in Belgian football.

Overview
CS Verviétois was relegated to the second division at the end of the season and was replaced by second division champion Beerschot AC.

National team

* Belgium score given first

Key
 H = Home match
 A = Away match
 F = Friendly
 o.g. = own goal

Honours

Final league tables

Division I

Promotion
In the first stage, 4 provincial leagues were played, with the following qualifiers for the final round:
 For Brabant, Atheneum VV (winner) and Olympia Club de Bruxelles (runner-up) qualified via the Brabant final round
 For Antwerp, Beerschot AC (relegated last season) qualified
 For East and West Flanders, AA La Gantoise qualified
 For Liège, Standard FC Liégeois qualified

External links
Belgian clubs history

References